Sadik Basha (born 4 June 2002) is an Albanian footballer who plays as a goalkeeper for Luftëtari in the Kategoria e Parë.

Career

Luftëtari
A graduate of the club's youth academy, Basha made his competitive debut for the club on 29 January 2020 in a 3–0 defeat to Apolonia in the Albanian Cup. He made his Albanian Superliga debut later that season, playing the entirety of a 3–1 away defeat to Laçi on 11 July.

References

External links

2002 births
Living people
Luftëtari Gjirokastër players
Kategoria Superiore players
Albanian footballers
Association football goalkeepers